Lappeenrannan kisapuiston jäähalli, often shortened to Kisapuiston jäähalli, is an ice hockey arena in the  of Lappeenranta, Finland. It is best known as the home arena of SaiPa, an ice hockey team in the Liiga, and is therefore sometimes called Kisapuiston liigajäähalli.

The arena is also used for concerts, fairs, and as a venue for other sports, for example boxing.

History
An outdoor artificial ice rink located the site was opened on 23 October 1963; it was the fifth arteficial ice rink to be constructed in Finland. The rink was later enclosed and the ice hall opened on 30 September 1972.

Kisapuiston jäähalli was renovated and expanded in 2004. The work included expanding and updating public spaces, adding new safety protections, building nine suites, replacing the scoreboards, and renewing the sound and lighting systems.

In 2016, a structural inspection of the building was completed, the results of which identified weakness in the integrity of the roof. Due to the weight restrictions, the roof of the arena has to be cleared of snow in the winter. At the time of inspection, it was thought that the roof's issues would prevent the ceiling-suspended scoreboard from being replaced, however, a new four-sided digital scoreboard was able to be installed ahead of the 2021–22 Liiga season.

Gallery

References

Indoor arenas in Finland
Indoor ice hockey venues in Finland
Lappeenranta
Buildings and structures in South Karelia